Burns v. Reed, 500 U.S. 478 (1991), was a United States Supreme Court case. A prosecutor was absolutely immune from damages based upon positions taken in a probable cause hearing for a search warrant. The same prosecutor was not held entitled to immunity for giving legal advice to the police about the legality of an investigative practice.

References

External links
 

United States Supreme Court cases
United States Supreme Court cases of the Rehnquist Court
1991 in United States case law